Lower Woodley is a hamlet in the parish of Lanivet (where the population at the 2011 census was included.), Cornwall, England.

References

Hamlets in Cornwall